Djékanou is a town in central Ivory Coast. It is a sub-prefecture of and the seat of Djékanou Department in Bélier Region, Lacs District. Djékanou is also a commune.

In 2014, the population of the sub-prefecture of Djékanou was 20,090.

Villages
The 14 villages of the sub-prefecture of Djékanou and their population in 2014 are:

People 
 Sinaly Diomandé, Football player

References

Sub-prefectures of Bélier
Communes of Bélier